"We Live" is the second single from the album Beauty from Pain by Christian rock band Superchick. It features the vocals of Tricia Brock, Melissa Brock and Matt Dally. The song was on the Billboard Christian Songs chart for 20 weeks, peaking at No. 6. Unlike other Superchick songs, which contain an alternative-based pop/rock, "We Live" has a hip hop sound. The song was used in the TV show Brothers and Sisters and in the compilation WOW Hits 2007.

Music video
The music video for the single "We Live" was released on October 10, 2008. The video features the band performing the song in brick room. Throughout the video, it shows a man looking through an x-ray, multiple people taking photos, and a soldier returning to his wife.

Charts

References 

2006 singles
Superchick songs
2006 songs